Faristenia is a genus of moths in the family Gelechiidae.

Species
 Faristenia acerella Ponomarenko, 1991
 Faristenia angustivalvata Li & Zheng, 1998
 Faristenia atrimaculata Park, 1993
 Faristenia circulicaudata Li & Zheng, 1998
 Faristenia cornutivalvaris Li & Zheng, 1998
 Faristenia furtumella Ponomarenko, 1991
 Faristenia geminisignella Ponomarenko, 1991
 Faristenia hirowatarii Ueda, 2012
 Faristenia impenicilla Li & Zheng, 1998
 Faristenia jumbongae Park, 1993
 Faristenia kanazawai Ueda & Ponomarenko, 2000
 Faristenia kangxianensis Li & Zheng, 1998
 Faristenia maritimella Ponomarenko, 1991
 Faristenia medimaculata Li & Zheng, 1998
 Faristenia mukurossivora Ueda & Ponomarenko, 2000
 Faristenia nakatanii Ueda, 2012
 Faristenia nemoriella Ponomarenko, 1998
 Faristenia obliqua Park, Lee & Lee, 2000
 Faristenia omelkoi Ponomarenko, 1991
 Faristenia pallida Li & Zheng, 1998
 Faristenia polemica (Meyrick, 1935)
 Faristenia praemaculata (Meyrick, 1931)
 Faristenia quercivora Ponomarenko, 1991
Faristenia tamarinda 
 Faristenia triangula Li & Zheng, 1998
 Faristenia ussuriella Ponomarenko, 1991
 Faristenia wuyiensis Li & Zheng, 1998

References

 , 2000: New faunistic data of Gelechiidae (Lepidoptera) in Taiwan, with description of a new species. Insecta Koreana 17 (3): 181-192.
 , 1998: New taxonomic data on Dichomeridinae (Lepidoptera: Gelechiidae) from the Russian Far East. Far Eastern Entomologist 67: 1-17. Full article: 
 , 2012: Additional two new species of the genus Faristenia Ponomarenko (Lepidoptera, Gelechiidae) from Japan. Transactions of the Lepidopterological Society of Japan 63(2): 65-69.

 
Chelariini